The Kings Falls Limestone is a geologic formation in New York state, USA. It preserves fossils dating back to the Ordovician period.

See also

 List of fossiliferous stratigraphic units in New York

References
 

Ordovician geology of New York (state)